Szropy  is a village in the administrative district of Gmina Stary Targ, within Sztum County, Pomeranian Voivodeship, in northern Poland.

For the history of the region, see History of Pomerania.

The village has a population of 330.

Szropy has its own football team, Tecza, which means Rainbow in English.

References

Szropy